Zhangixalus arboreus, also known as the forest green tree frog and Kinugasa flying frog,  is a species of frog in the family Rhacophoridae endemic to Japan.

The natural habitats of Z. arboreus are subtropical or tropical moist lowland forest, freshwater marshes, and irrigated land. These small tree frogs spend their adult lives in trees and forests, and in breeding season gather around water sources to mate. They lay their eggs within a batch of sponge-like foam which is suspended from a tree branch, usually hanging over a pond, marsh, or slow-flowing stream. The tadpoles emerge from the eggs, wiggle their way out of the foam, and drop down into the water below. These batches of foam can often be seen hanging over ponds in the Japanese countryside in late spring. Sometimes the frogs mistakenly lay their eggs over inappropriate bodies of water, such as swimming pools, wells, or even buckets containing rainwater.

References

External links

Endemic amphibians of Japan
Arboreus
Taxonomy articles created by Polbot
Amphibians described in 1924